Sophie Gräfin von Hatzfeldt, born Gräfin von Hatzfeldt-Schönstein zu Trachenberg (10 August 1805, Trachenberg (Lower Silesia) – 25 January 1881, Wiesbaden) was active in the German working-class movement and partner and confidante of Ferdinand Lassalle.

Early life
She was the daughter of Prussian general Franz Ludwig von Hatzfeldt zu Trachenberg (1756−1827) and Countess Friederike Karoline von der Schulenburg (1779–1832), a daughter of the Prussian minister to the General Directorate Friedrich Wilhelm von Schulenburg-Kehnert.  His older sister, Countess Luise von Hatzfeldt was the wife of Prussian General Ludwig Freiherr Roth von Schreckenstein, the Minister of War. Among her other siblings was brother Prince Hermann Anton von Hatzfeldt and sister Maximilian von Hatzfeldt. From Prince Hermann's second marriage to Countess Marie von Nimptsch, she was aunt to Prince Hermann von Hatzfeldt, who represented the Deutsche Reichspartei in the Reichstag. She grew up in the Hatzfeld Palace of Trachenberg and in Berlin.

Life 
In 1822, Sophie was forced to marry her cousin, Edmund Fürst von Hatzfeldt-Wildenburg (1798–1874) with whom she had three children (including Paul von Hatzfeldt, who was Ambassador to London and Constantinople, Foreign Secretary, and Head of the Foreign Office).  The marriage was unhappy, as her husband was controlling her money and her movements. They separated in 1833.

In 1846, when she was in her early forties, she made the acquaintance of Ferdinand Lassalle (1825–1864).  In a long and relentless lawsuit to gain a divorce from the unhappy marriage and her fight for her rights as an independent woman, she was represented by Lassalle, who saw the process as a fight against injustice in general. Sophie became an independent and politically active woman; her house in Düsseldorf became an important meeting point of activists, including Karl Marx, during the March revolution in 1848.  

After Lassalle's death in 1864, seeing herself as the one responsible for continuing his work, she saw to the publishing of his hitherto unpublished writings and was active in the Allgemeiner Deutscher Arbeiterverein (ADAV) that had been founded by Lasalle - even if, according to Prussian law, she was not allowed to become an official member. In 1867, she founded an ADAV splinter group, the Lassallescher Allgemeiner Deutscher Arbeiterverein (LADAV). After a lack of political success, she retired from politics and died in 1881.

Even if she did not succeed in implementing Lassalle's views as the ones that would further guide the working-class movement, she was highly appreciated by many workers and left her mark on the movement.

Family 
Sophie and Edmund von Hatzfeldt-Wildenburg married on 10 August 1822 and divorced in 1851. They had two sons and one daughter:

 Alfred von Hatzfeldt-Wildenburg (9 April 1825 – 3 June 1911), married in 1852 to Gabriele von Dietrichstein-Proskau-Leslie (1825–1909), had issue.
 Melanie von Hatzfeldt-Wildenburg (29 October 1825 – 28 February 1911), married in 1852 to Maximilian von Nesselrode-Ehreshoven (1817–1898), had issue.
 Paul von Hatzfeldt-Wildenburg (8 October 1831 – 22 November 1901), married in 1863 to Helene Moulton (1846–1918), had issue.

See also 
 House of Hatzfeld

References 

1805 births
1881 deaths
House of Hatzfeld
German socialists
People from Żmigród